Michael Sangwon Kim (born July 14, 1993) is an American professional golfer with one PGA Tour victory.

Early life
Kim is the son of Sun and Yun Kim. He was born in Seoul, South Korea but raised in San Diego, California, where he went to Torrey Pines High School.

College career
Kim attended the University of California, Berkeley. In April 2013, Kim was Pac-12 Men's Golfer of the Month. 

On June 2, 2013, he became the first Cal men's golfer to ever win national player of the year honors when he was named by the Golf Coaches Association of America as the Division I recipient of the 2013 Jack Nicklaus Award.

On June 11, 2013 Kim won the Haskins Award, which is given to the national player of the year in men's college golf and selected by voting from players, coaches and members of the national media.

2013 U.S. Open
Kim qualified for the 2013 U.S. Open by being co-medalist at his sectional qualifier. After the third round, Kim was tied for 10th. He finished tied for 17th and was the low amateur.

Professional career
Kim turned professional in December 2013. He had limited status on the 2014 Web.com Tour after finishing T-56 at the Web.com Tour Qualifying Tournament. He played in 17 events, making the cut in eleven with a best finish of T-2 at the Price Cutter Charity Championship. 

Kim played on the Web.com Tour again in 2015 based on his finish in the Web.com Tour Finals. He finished 13th on the money list in the 2015 Web.com Tour, earning a full-time membership to the PGA Tour for 2016.

Kim has been a full-time member of the PGA Tour since 2016, and won his first PGA Tour event at the 2018 John Deere Classic by eight shots, setting the Tournament scoring record. In the process, he earned the final invitation to the 2018 Open Championship.

Kim missed 19 cuts in 20 events on the PGA Tour in 2019 and, as of August 26, 2019, fell to 502nd in the Official World Golf Ranking.

In the 2020–21 PGA Tour season, Kim made only nine cuts in thirty starts and finished 214th in the 2021 FedEx Cup. He lost his full PGA Tour Card. In 2021–22, Kim returned to the Korn Ferry Tour and regained his PGA Tour card for the 2022–23 PGA Tour season.

Professional wins (1)

PGA Tour wins (1)

Results in major championships

LA = Low amateur
CUT = missed the half-way cut
"T" = tied

U.S. national team appearances
Amateur
Palmer Cup: 2013 (winners)
Walker Cup: 2013 (winners)

See also
2015 Web.com Tour Finals graduates
2022 Korn Ferry Tour Finals graduates

References

External links

American male golfers
California Golden Bears men's golfers
PGA Tour golfers
Korn Ferry Tour graduates
Golfers from San Diego
American sportspeople of Korean descent
South Korean emigrants to the United States
Golfers from Seoul
Golfers from Houston
1993 births
Living people